Frederick Sydney Stolle, AO (born 8 October 1938) is an Australian former amateur world No. 1 tennis player and commentator. He was born in Hornsby, New South Wales, Australia. He is the father of former Australian Davis Cup player Sandon Stolle.

Career
Stolle is notable for being the only male player in history to have lost his first five Grand Slam singles finals, the fifth of which he led by two sets to love. However, Stolle went on to win two Grand Slam tournament singles titles, the 1965 French Championships and the 1966 US Championships. At Wimbledon and the Australian Championships he finished as runner-up in these tournaments and losing to compatriot Roy Emerson on no fewer than five occasions. World Tennis magazine ranked Stolle world No. 1 amateur in 1966.

Stolle won ten Grand Slam doubles titles, partnering with compatriots Bob Hewitt (4 titles), Roy Emerson (4 titles) and Ken Rosewall (2 titles). In addition Stolle won 7 Grand Slam mixed doubles titles.

As a member of the Australian Davis Cup team Stolle won the Davis Cup title in 1964, 1965 and 1966. In 1964 Stolle and Emerson were briefly suspended from the Australian Davis Cup team for going on an overseas tour in defiance of a Lawn Tennis Association of Australia order to remain in Australia until April.

Stolle turned professional in 1966, and as a pro, won two singles and 13 doubles titles. He earned about US$500,000 in career prize money.

Stolle coached Vitas Gerulaitis from 1977 until 1983.

For many years, Stolle did TV commentary for ESPN and other tennis broadcasts. He currently provides commentary on Grand Slam tennis tournaments for Australia's Fox Sports and the Nine Network.

Honours
For his contribution to the tennis sport Fred Stolle was inducted into the International Tennis Hall of Fame in 1985. In 1988 he was inducted into the Sport Australia Hall of Fame. He received an Australian Sports Medal in 2000 and was made an Officer of the Order of Australia in 2005. In 2020, Stolle was awarded the ITF Philippe Chatrier Award, for his contribution to tennis both during his career and post-retirement.

Grand Slam finals

Singles (2 titles, 6 runners-up)

Doubles (10 titles, 6 runners-up)

Open-era doubles titles (10)

Performance timeline

Singles

Note: The Australian Open was held twice in 1977, in January and December.

References

External links
 
 
 
 
 

Australian Championships (tennis) champions
Australian male tennis players
Australian Open (tennis) champions
French Championships (tennis) champions
French Open champions
People from the North Shore, Sydney
Tennis players from Sydney
Australian tennis commentators
Officers of the Order of Australia
Recipients of the Australian Sports Medal
International Tennis Hall of Fame inductees
Sport Australia Hall of Fame inductees
United States National champions (tennis)
US Open (tennis) champions
Wimbledon champions
Wimbledon champions (pre-Open Era)
1938 births
Living people
Grand Slam (tennis) champions in men's singles
Grand Slam (tennis) champions in mixed doubles
Grand Slam (tennis) champions in men's doubles
Professional tennis players before the Open Era
Australian people of German descent
World number 1 ranked male tennis players